Zacharias Ursinus (18 July 15346 May 1583) was a sixteenth-century German Reformed theologian and Protestant reformer, born Zacharias Baer in Breslau (now Wrocław, Poland). He became the leading theologian of the Reformed Protestant movement of the Palatinate, serving both at the University of Heidelberg and the College of Wisdom (Collegium Sapientiae). He is best known as the principal author and interpreter of the Heidelberg Catechism.

Origins and early education
At age fifteen he enrolled at the University of Wittenberg, boarding for the next seven years with Philipp Melanchthon, the erudite successor of Martin Luther. Like many young scholars of that era he gave himself a Latin name, in his case one that was based on his German name, Baer, stemming from Latin ursus, meaning bear. Melanchthon admired young Ursinus for his intellectual gifts and his spiritual maturity, commending him to mentors throughout Europe. He was a lifelong protégé of the prominent imperial physician Johannes Crato von Krafftheim, who likewise hailed from Wrocław. Subsequently, Ursinus studied under Reformation scholars at Strasbourg, Basel, Lausanne, and Geneva. Sojourns in Lyon and Orléans gave him expertise in Hebrew, as well as studying under Jean Mercier in Paris. Returning to Wrocław he published a pamphlet on the sacraments, which aroused the ire of Lutherans who charged him with being more Reformed than Lutheran. The Wrocław opponents’ vitriolic reaction succeeded in driving him out of the city to Zürich, where he became friends with Zwingli's successor Heinrich Bullinger and the Italian Reformer Peter Martyr Vermigli.

In Heidelberg and Neustadt
In 1561, upon Vermigli's recommendation, Frederick III, Elector Palatine, appointed him professor in the Collegium Sapientiae at Heidelberg, where in 1562/63, having been commissioned by the Prince elector, he supplied the preliminary drafts for the Heidelberg Catechism and participated in the final revision of the document alongside other theologians and church leaders. Caspar Olevianus (1536–1587) was formerly asserted as a co-author of the document, though this theory has been largely discarded by modern scholarship. 

The death of the Elector Frederick and the accession of the Lutheran Ludwig IV in 1576, led to the removal of Ursinus, who occupied a professorial chair at the Casmirianum a  Reformed academy at Neustadt an der Weinstraße from 1578 until his death.  He died, aged 48, in Neustadt an der Weinstraße.

Impact
His Works were published in 1587–1589, and a more complete edition by his son and two of his pupils, David Pareus and Quirinius Reuter, in 1612. Ursinus's collected catechical lectures (Het Schatboeck der verclaringhen over de Catechismus) was one of the most prominent theological handbooks among seventeenth century Reformed Christians and was especially popular in the Netherlands. Reformed German and Dutch immigrants to North America celebrated his legacy—especially his role in the creation of the Heidelberg Catechism. Ursinus College in Collegeville, Pennsylvania, is a liberal arts college founded in 1869 in his name.

References

External links
 
 
Biography

Further reading 
 
 
 Dirk Visser. Zacharias Ursinus the Reluctant Reformer--His Life and Times. New York: United Church Press, 1983.
 Boris Wagner-Peterson, Doctrina schola vitae. Zacharias Ursinus (1534-1583) als Schriftausleger, Göttingen: Vandenhoeck & Ruprecht, 2013 (Refo500 Academic Studies 13).  (= Dissertation Universität Heidelberg 2011/12).
 

1534 births
1583 deaths
Writers from Wrocław
Academic staff of the Collegium Sapientiae (Heidelberg)
Academic staff of Heidelberg University
German Calvinist and Reformed theologians
16th-century Calvinist and Reformed theologians
16th-century German male writers
16th-century German Protestant theologians
German male non-fiction writers